Layered, Inc., was an American software company based in Boston, Massachusetts. The company chiefly developed for Apple's Macintosh computer.  At the time of its acquisition in 1990 by Peachtree Software, of Norcross, Georgia, Layered was considered the market leader in accounting software for the Mac, with InfoWorld calling Layered "the Rolls-Royce of Macintosh accounting software". It marketed the Insight Expert Accounting family of software in 1985 and atOnce! in 1989, the latter rebranded as Peachtree Accounting for Macintosh after the company's acquisition.

References

1990 disestablishments in Massachusetts
1990 mergers and acquisitions
Accounting software
Macintosh software companies
Defunct software companies of the United States
Software companies based in Massachusetts
Software companies disestablished in 1990
Technology companies based in the Boston area